Samuel Jefferson "Jeff" Flake (June 25, 1877 – May 30, 1971) was an American politician in the state of Florida. He served in the Florida State Senate in 1947 as a Democratic member for the 27th district.

References

1877 births
1971 deaths
Democratic Party Florida state senators